Salai may refer to:

 Boswellia serrata, Indian frankincense
 Salaì (1480–1524), nickname of Gian Giacomo Caprotti da Oreno, an Italian artist and pupil of Leonardo da Vinci 
 Salai (needle), a turban needle used by Sikhs
 Śālā, also spelled salai or calai, a school attached to a 1st-millennium Hindu or Jain temple in South India
 Salai, Hsi Hseng, a village in Hsi Hseng Township, Burma